Robert D. Yates (December 27, 1857 in Brooklyn; September 19, 1885) was an American draughts champion and medical doctor. He was considered to be prodigious at draughts and was the only American to hold the title of world champion in the 19th century, which he won from James Wyllie in 1876 at age 18. He held the title until 1878 when he retired as world champion and the title reverted to Wyllie. He died of typhus at age 27 while serving as ships physician aboard the steamship Scheidam and was buried at sea.

External links
Checkerworld
Museum of Checkers History; Timeline 1870-1879
Wylie draughts

1857 births
People from Brooklyn
American checkers players
1885 deaths
American physicians